Champions of Change (COC) is an Indian award for promoting Indian values like community service, social development, healthcare, education and national unity, selected by constitutional jury members headed by K. G. Balakrishnan, the Former Chief Justice of India and Former Chairman NHRC and Justice Gyan Sudha Misra, Former Judge, Supreme Court of India. The awards are organised annually and usually presented by the President of India, Vice President of India, former President of India, former Vice president of India or any leading political figure of India.

Champions of Change Awards are organized by Interactive Forum on Indian Economy (IFIE), which is a Government of India recognized (80G, 12A, 8A compliant), not-for-profit company dedicated for the development and welfare of women and children of rural India. IFIE annually organizes Champions of Change Award at International, National and state-Level in India. Nandan Jha is the founder and organizer of champions of change awards and chairman of the 'Interactive Forum on Indian Economy'.

The award comprises a certificate and a gold medal. It is given in four categories, namely:
Application of Education, Healthcare, Science and Technology for Rural development.
Outstanding contribution for the Development and Welfare of Women and Children
Outstanding contribution in Swatch Bharat Abhiyan

Jury

2018
Justice K G Balakrishnan (Former Chief Justice of India and Former Chairman National Human Rights Commission of India(NHRC))
Justice Gyan Sudha Misra (Former justice Supreme court of India)
S. Y. Quraishi (Former Chief election Commissioner of India)
Pahlaj Nihalani Former Chairman CBFC (Central Board of film certification India) 
Subhash Ghai (Vetron Indian Film Director)

2019
Justice K G Balakrishnan (Former Chief Justice of India and Former Chairman NHRC)
Justice Gyan Sudha Misra (Former justice Supreme court of India)
Pahlaj Nihalani Former Chairman CBFC (Central Board of film certification India) 
Subhash Ghai (Vetron Indian Film Director)

2020
Justice K G Balakrishnan (Former Chief Justice of India and Former Chairman NHRC)
Justice Gyan Sudha Misra (Former justice Supreme court of India)
R. Dayakar (IFS, Former Indian Ambassador)
Subhash Ghai (Vetron Indian Film Director)

History

2018 Awardees
The first edition ceremony took place on 26 December’ 2018 at Vigyan Bhavan New Delhi with Hon’ble Vice President of India M. Venkaiah Naidu as the Chief Guest and notable awardees included:

N. Biren Singh (Chief Minister of Manipur)
Sadhvi Niranjan Jyoti (Union Minister Govt Of India)
Jaswant SinghSumanbhai Bhabhor (Union Minister Govt Of India)
Bidyut Baran Mahato (MP/LS, Jamshedpur, Jharkhand)
Nishikant Dubey (MP/LS/Godda, Jharkhand)
Ritu Jaiswal
 Srinubabu Gedela

2019 Awardees
The second edition of COC happened at 10, Rajaji Marg (Residence of Former President of India, Late Shri Pranab Mukherjee) & Vigyan Bhavan, New Delhi on 20 January’2020 with Former President of India Late Shri Pranab Mukherjee as Chief Guest and notable awardees included:

Hemant Soren Shri Hemant Soren (Chief minister of Jharkhand), Social Welfare
Manish Sisodia (Dy Chief Minister of Delhi), (Education)
Anurag Thakur (Mos Finance & Corporate Affairs), Social Welfare
Acharya Balakrishnan (Patanjali), Social Welfare
Suresh Oberoi & (The Awakening of Brahma Kumaris),
Geeta Koda (MP LS), Social Welfare
Abhinav Singh ( Co- Secretary of India at Gandhi Mandela Foundation (GMF)) - Uttar Pradesh

2020 Awardees
The third edition took place at Taj Resort & Convention Centre, Goa on 16 April’2021 with Hon’ble Governor of Maharashtra & Goa Shri Bhagat Singh Koshyari as chief guest and list of awardees included:

Pramod Sawant, Chief Minister of Goa
Shripad Naik, Union Minister for Ayush Ministry & MoS Defense
M.K. Stalin, President of DMK
Hema Malini, MP & Veteran Indian Film Actress
Pahlaj Nihalani, Former Chairman Censor Board & Veteran Film Producer
Sonu Nigam (Renowned Playback Singer)
Hema Sardesai (Renowned Playback Singer)
Sushmita Sen (Former Miss Universe and Film Actor)
Suresh Jain (Bharat Vikas Parishad, Social Service)
Swami Chidanand Sarswati (Founder, Parmarth Niketan)
Raj K. Purohit
Vipul Goel
Sabarna Roy Indian Author, Culture, West Bengal

2021 Awardees 

Divyanka Tripathi
Shivraj Singh Chouhan

State Awards

Maharashtra
Champions of Change Maharashtra Award is a highly reputed state award for recognition and acknowledgement of the efforts of those who work to bring change in the society. First Edition of Champions of Change Maharashtra Award was organized on 30 September'2021 at Taj Mahal Palace, Mumbai with Hon'ble Governor of Maharashtra Shri Bhagat Singh Koshyari as the Chief Guest. The notable awardees included Devendra Fadnavis, Dilip Walse-Patil, Nana Patole, Jackie Shroff, Dia Mirza, Nawazuddin Siddiqui, Himanshu Shah, Motilal Oswal, Sindhutai Sapkal, and Popatrao Pawar. The selection of awardees is done by Constitutional Jury headed by Former Supreme Court Judge of India.

Telangana 

The awardees for the 2021 Edition included actress Samantha Ruth Prabhu who won the award under the category of “Outstanding Contribution for the Development of Women and Children”.

References

2018 establishments in India
Indian awards